Max Binder (born 26 November 1947) is a Swiss politician. He was a member of the National Council from the Canton of Zurich from 1991 to 2015 and served as the President (speaker) of the National Council from 2003 to 2004. A farmer by profession, he was member of the parliament of the canton of Zurich from 1985 to 1990. Since 1990, he is a municipal councilor in Illnau-Effretikon in charge of the Health Department. 

He was elected to the National Council in 1991 as a candidate of the Swiss People's Party and re-elected 11 times. He paid visits to India as deputy Speaker (1993) and Bulgaria and Canada as Speaker (2004).

External links

1947 births
Living people
Members of the National Council (Switzerland)
Presidents of the National Council (Switzerland)
Swiss People's Party politicians
Illnau-Effretikon
People from Pfäffikon District